was a   after Meiō and before Eishō. This period spanned the years from February 1501 through February 1504.

Change of era
 1501 :  The era name was changed  to mark the anniversary of the enthronement of Go-Kashiwabara and the 58th year of the Chinese zodiac. The previous era ended and a new one commenced in 1501 (Meiō 10, 29th day of the 2nd month).

Events of the Bunki era
 1501 (Bunki 1): The former shōgun Yoshimura was exiled; and he retired to Suō Province, and he lived in exile in the home of the daimyō of that han. He changed his name to Ashikaga Yoshitane; and he summoned all the military forces of the western empire to come to his aid. Hosokawa Masamoto was made master of all the provinces which encircled the Kinai.
 1502 (Bunki 2,  7th month): Minamoto no Yoshitaka was elevated to the 2nd tier of the 4th class kuge officials, and he expressed thanks to the emperor for that honor. In the same month, the name of Ashikaga Yoshitaka was changed to that of Yoshizumi.
 1503 (Bunki 3): There was a great drought in the summer of this year.

Notes

References
 Nussbaum, Louis Frédéric and Käthe Roth. (2005). Japan Encyclopedia. Cambridge: Harvard University Press. ; OCLC 48943301
 Titsingh, Isaac. (1834). Nihon Ōdai Ichiran; ou,  Annales des empereurs du Japon.  Paris: Royal Asiatic Society, Oriental Translation Fund of Great Britain and Ireland. OCLC 5850691

External links
 National Diet Library, "The Japanese Calendar" -- historical overview plus illustrative images from library's collection

Japanese eras
1500s in Japan
1501 establishments in Japan